
Year 423 (CDXXIII) was a common year starting on Monday (link will display the full calendar) of the Julian calendar. At the time, it was known as the Year of the Consulship of Marinianus and Asclepiodotus (or, less frequently, year 1176 Ab urbe condita). The denomination 423 for this year has been used since the early medieval period, when the Anno Domini calendar era became the prevalent method in Europe for naming years.

Events 
 By place 

 Roman Empire 
 August 15 – Emperor Honorius, age 38, dies at Ravenna of dropsy, perhaps pulmonary edema. With no children to claim the throne, Joannes, primicerius notariorum ("chief notary", head of the civil service), seizes the throne of the Western Roman Empire, and is declared emperor. Among his supporters are  Flavius Aetius, Roman general (magister militum). Joannes' rule is accepted in the dioceses of Gaul, Hispania and Italia, but not in Africa.
 Winter – Emperor Theodosius II refuses to recognize Joannes as emperor, and prepares for war. He mobilizes an expeditionary force under command of Ardaburius, and his son Flavius Aspar.

 By topic 

 Religion 
 Theodoret becomes bishop of Cyrrhus (Syria). He converts more than 1,000 Marcionites in his diocese.

Births 
 Theodosius the Cenobiarch, monk and founder of the Monastery of St. Theodosius (approximate date)

Deaths 
 August 15 – Honorius, Roman Emperor (b. 384)
 December 23 – Ming Yuan Di, ruler of the Xianbei state Northern Wei (b. 392)
 Eulalius, antipope of Rome
 Tufa, Chinese princess and wife of Qifu Chipan
 Xiao Wenshou, empress dowager of the Liu Song Dynasty (b. 343)

References